Greeley Township may refer to the following townships in the United States:

 Greeley Township, Audubon County, Iowa
 Greeley Township, Saline County, Kansas
 Greeley Township, Sedgwick County, Kansas